Jammu and Kashmir may refer to:
 Kashmir, the northernmost geographical region of the Indian subcontinent
 Jammu and Kashmir (union territory), a region administered by India as a union territory since 2019
 Jammu and Kashmir (state), a region administered by India as a state from 1952 to 2019
 Jammu and Kashmir (princely state), a princely state of the British Raj extending into the Indian Union between 1846 and 1952
 Azad Jammu and Kashmir, or Azad Kashmir, a region administered by Pakistan as an autonomous administrative division

See also
Kashmir conflict
Aksai Chin
Trans-Karakoram Tract
Gilgit-Baltistan
Ladakh
Jammu (disambiguation)
Kashmir (disambiguation)